The 2005 All-SEC football team consists of American football players selected to the All-Southeastern Conference (SEC) chosen by the Associated Press (AP) and the conference coaches for the 2005 NCAA Division I-A football season.

The Georgia Bulldogs won the conference, beating the LSU Tigers 34 to 14 in the SEC Championship.

Vanderbilt quarterback Jay Cutler was voted AP SEC Offensive Player of the Year. Alabama linebacker Demeco Ryans, a unanimous selection by both AP and the coaches, was voted AP SEC Defensive Player of the Year.

Offensive selections

Quarterbacks
 Jay Cutler, Vanderbilt (AP-1, Coaches-1)
 D. J. Shockley, Georgia (AP-1, Coaches-2)
Chris Leak, Florida (AP-2)

Running backs
Kenny Irons*, Auburn (AP-1, Coaches-1)
 Darren McFadden, Arkansas (AP-1, Coaches-1)
 Kenneth Darby, Alabama (AP-2, Coaches-1)
Jerious Norwood, Miss. St. (AP-2, Coaches-2)
Rafael Little, Kentucky (Coaches-2)

Wide receivers
 Sidney Rice, South Carolina (AP-1, Coaches-1)
Chad Jackson, Florida (AP-1, Coaches-2)
Earl Bennett, Vanderbilt (AP-2, Coaches-1)
D. J. Hall, Alabama (AP-2)
Tyrone Prothro, Alabama (Coaches-2)

Centers
Mike Degory, Florida (AP-1, Coaches-1)
Rudy Niswanger, LSU (AP-2, Coaches-2)

Guards
Max Jean-Gilles†, Georgia (AP-1, Coaches-1)
Tim Duckworth, Auburn (AP-2, Coaches-2)
Kyle Roper, Arkansas (AP-2)
Will Arnold, LSU (Coaches-2)

Tackles
Marcus McNeill†, Auburn (AP-1, Coaches-1)
Arron Sears, Tennessee (AP-1, Coaches-1)
Andrew Whitworth#, LSU (AP-1, Coaches-1)
Tre Stallings, Ole Miss (Coaches-1)
Daniel Inman, Georgia (AP-2, Coaches-2)
Randy Hand, Florida (AP-2, Coaches-2)
Brian Stamper, Vanderbilt (Coaches-2)

Tight ends
 Leonard Pope*, Georgia (AP-1, Coaches-1)
Dustin Dunning, Vanderbilt (AP-2, Coaches-2)

Defensive selections

Defensive ends
 Willie Evans, Miss. St. (AP-1, Coaches-1)
 Quentin Moses, Georgia (AP-1, Coaches-1) 
 Jeremy Mincey, Florida (AP-2, Coaches-2) 
 Parys Haralson, Tennessee (AP-2, Coaches-2) 
 Marquies Gunn, Auburn (AP-2) 
 Mark Anderson, Alabama (Coaches-2)

Defensive tackles 
Claude Wroten, LSU (AP-1, Coaches-1)
Kyle Williams, LSU (AP-1, Coaches-2)
Jason Hall, Tennessee (AP-2)
Keith Jackson, Arkansas (AP-2)
Justin Harrell, Tennessee (AP-2)
T. J. Jackson, Auburn (AP-2)

Linebackers
DeMeco Ryans†, Alabama (AP-1, Coaches-1)
Patrick Willis, Ole Miss (AP-1, Coaches-1)
Moses Osemwegie, Vanderbilt (AP-1, Coaches-1)
Sam Olajubutu, Arkansas (AP-2, Coaches-1)
Freddie Roach, Alabama (AP-2, Coaches-2)
Kevin Simon, Tennessee (AP-2, Coaches-2)
Travis Williams, Auburn (AP-2, Coaches-2)
Omar Gaither, Tennessee (Coaches-2)

Cornerbacks
Dee Webb, Florida (AP-1, Coaches-2)
Demario Minter, Georgia (AP-1, Coaches-2)
Tim Jennings, Georgia (AP-1)
David Irons, Auburn (AP-2)
Johnathan Joseph, South Carolina (AP-2)

Safeties 
Greg Blue†, Georgia (AP-1, Coaches-1)
Ko Simpson*, South Carolina (AP-1, Coaches-1)
LaRon Landry, LSU (AP-2, Coaches-1)
Roman Harper, Alabama (Coaches-1)
Muhammed Abdullah, Kentucky (AP-2, Coaches-2)
Will Herring, Auburn, (AP-2, Coaches-2)

Special teams

Kickers
 Brandon Couto*, Georgia (AP-1, Coaches-1)
Chris Hetland, Florida (AP-2, Coaches-2)

Punters
Kody Bliss, Auburn (AP-1, Coaches-1)
Gordon Ely-Kelso, Georgia (AP-2, Coaches-2)

All purpose/return specialist
Skyler Green, LSU (AP-2, Coaches-1)
Raphael Little, Kentucky (AP-1)
Felix Jones, Arkansas (Coaches-2)

Key
Bold = Consensus first-team selection by both the coaches and AP

AP = Associated Press

Coaches = Selected by the SEC coaches

* = Unanimous selection of AP

# = Unanimous selection of Coaches

† = Unanimous selection of both AP and Coaches

See also
2005 College Football All-America Team

References

All-Southeastern Conference
All-SEC football teams